is a metro station in Higashi-ku, Sapporo, Hokkaido, Japan. The station number is H01. It is the northern terminus of the Tōhō Line.

The Sapporo Community Dome is about 11 minutes' walking distance from the station.

Platforms

Surrounding area
 Okadama Airport
 Sapporo Community Dome
 Japan Self-Defense Forces Okadama Garrison
 Sakae-Higashi East Police Station
 The Big Discount stores Express Sakaemachi store
 ÆON Sapporo Sakaemachi store
 Sapporo North 43 Post Office
 North Pacific Bank, Sakaemachi branch
 Asahikawa Shinkin Bank, Sakae-Cho branch
 Hokkaido Bank, Sakaemachi branch

External links
 Sapporo Subway Stations

 

Railway stations in Japan opened in 1988
Railway stations in Sapporo
Sapporo Municipal Subway
Higashi-ku, Sapporo